Zero Cool is Michael Crichton's fifth published novel, and the fourth to feature his pseudonym John Lange. It was released in 1969 under the pseudonym of John Lange, and was his fourth Lange book.

Plot
An American doctor goes to Spain to present a paper at a conference and take a holiday. He meets a mysterious woman and is asked to perform an autopsy on a member of the underworld. He finds himself in a conspiracy to obtain a jewel.

Re-release
The novel was re-released in 2008 as part of the Hard Case Crime series. For this release, Crichton wrote two short new framing chapters, in addition to doing an overall revision of the text. Hard Case Crime republished the novel under Crichton's name on November 19, 2013.

References

Novels by Michael Crichton
1969 American novels
Works published under a pseudonym
Novels set in Spain
Novels set in France
Signet Books books